Van Ommen is a Dutch surname. Notable people with the surname include:

 (born 1956), Dutch painter and graphic artist
Jörg van Ommen (born 1962), German racing driver
Acel Van Ommen (born 1976), Filipina singer and songwriter

Dutch-language surnames